The 2016 Veikkausliiga is the 86th season of top-tier football in Finland. The season started on 2 April 2016; the regular season ended on 23 October 2016, with a promotion/relegation playoff continuing until 29 October. SJK were the defending champions.

Teams
FF Jaro were relegated to Ykkönen after finishing at the bottom of the 2015 season. Their place was taken by Ykkönen champions PS Kemi.

KTP as 11th-placed team lost their Veikkausliiga spot after losing to second-placed Ykkönen team PK-35 Vantaa 3–2 on aggregate in a relegation/promotion playoff.

Stadia and locations

 SJK will move to their new stadium OmaSp Stadion in June 2016 (capacity 6,000).

Personnel and kits

Managerial changes

League table

Results

Matches 1–22

Matches 23–33

Relegation play-offs

Statistics

Top scorers
Source: veikkausliiga.com

Top assists
Source: veikkausliiga.com

Awards

Annual awards

Team of the Year

References

Veikkausliiga seasons
Fin
Fin
1